Zodiak Media was an independent French production company.

In February 2016, Zodiak merged with Banijay.

History 
In 2008, the group re-branded itself as Zodiak Entertainment after the acquisition of Zodiak TV (Nordics, Eastern Europe, Russia).

In 2010, the company rebranded itself as Zodiak Media, following the acquisition of the RDF Media Group. Kids (now a Banijay company), the group's division dedicated to kids and family programming, was created in 2014.

In February 2016, Zodiak Media merged with Banijay.

References

External links

Banijay
Mass media in Paris
Television production companies of France
Mass media companies established in 2007
Mass media companies disestablished in 2016
2016 mergers and acquisitions